Faye Louise Bryson is an English football defender who plays for Reading in the FA Women's Super League.

Club career

Everton
Bryson began her youth career with Liverpool FC before being released and moving to Everton's academy where she captained the team in the 2014 FA Woman's Youth Cup final. Bryson made her senior debut in April 2015 in a WSL 2 match against London Bees. She scored her first goal for Everton against Aston Villa during the 2017 Spring Series.

Bristol City
On 18 January 2020, Bryson left Everton to sign with the FA WSL team Bristol City.

Reading 
On 6 July 2021, Bryson joined Reading, signing a two-year deal at the FA WSL club.

Career statistics

References

External links

Everton profile 

Living people
English women's footballers
Everton F.C. (women) players
Bristol City W.F.C. players
FA Women's National League players
Women's Super League players
1997 births
Women's association football defenders